Issa or ISSA may refer to:

Acronyms and abbreviations
Independent Schools Sports Association, now known as the Sports Association for Adelaide Schools
Information Systems Security Association
Instituto Superior de Secretariado y Administracion (ISSA), a center of the University of Navarra that trains elite management assistants
International Sailing Schools Association, an international association of sailing schools
International Sanamahism Students' Association, Kangleipak, an international association of the students of Sanamahism (traditional Meitei religion) of Kangleipak
International Securities Services Association, an association of securities services providers; see Borsa Istanbul
International Social Security Association, headquartered in Geneva, Switzerland
International Sports Sciences Association, an international organization of fitness experts which certifies personal fitness trainers
International Strategic Studies Association
Interscholastic Sailing Association
Irish Seed Savers Association

People
El-Issa family
Issa (clan), a Somali clan that mainly inhabits Djibouti
Issa (name), a given name and surname
Kobayashi Issa (1763–1828), a Japanese poet
Jane Siberry (born 1955), Canadian singer who released several albums under the name Issa
Issa, the nickname of Luttif Afif, a leader of the Black September terror squad at the 1972 Olympic Games
Issa or Isa, the Arabic name for Jesus in Islam
Issa, another name for the Native American Catawba people

Places
Issa (Lesbos) (Ἴσσα), ancient town of Lesbos, Greece, formerly applied to the island as well
Issa (polis), the Ancient Greek and Roman name for both the town of Vis and the Adriatic island of Vis, in modern-day Croatia
Siege of Issa, 230 BC to 229 BC 
Issa (inhabited locality) (Исса), several inhabited localities in Russia
Issa, Penza Oblast
Issa, Pskov Oblast
Issa, Polish spelling of Isa (river) (
The Issa Valley (Dolina Issy, 1955) memoir by Czesław Miłosz and its 1982 film adaptation, The Issa Valley (film)

Other uses
Issa (moth), a moth genus
Issa and Gurgura Liberation Front (IGLF), political faction in eastern Ethiopia, based amongst the Issa and Gurgura clans in northern Hararghe
Issa Album, 2017 album by 21 Savage
Siege of Issa, siege that took place from 230 BC to 229 BC between the forces of the Ancient Greek colony of Issa, aided by the Roman Republic, and the Ardiaean Kingdom of Illyria
Issa, a divine character in David Eddings's fantasy series The Belgariad and The Malloreon

See also
ISSE (disambiguation)
Issei